Alexander Bozhkov (August 9, 1951 – August 23, 2009) was Deputy Prime Minister and Industry Minister of Bulgaria from 1997 to 1999. Bozhkov played a major part in setting the general parameters of the economics policy of the Ivan Kostov government and was influential in instituting privatization. He was born in Sofia and died there on August 23, 2009 after years of prolonged illness, most recently cancer. He was 58.

References

1951 births
2009 deaths
Deaths from cancer in Bulgaria
Politicians from Sofia
Union of Democratic Forces (Bulgaria) politicians
Deputy prime ministers of Bulgaria
Government ministers of Bulgaria